Joseph Charles Scuderi (born 24 December 1968) is a professional cricketer.

From a young age through school he showed much potential to become a great cricketing prospect as a much respected all-rounder, later being inducted into the Australian Cricket Academy in Adelaide, South Australia, so much was his potential Queensland and South Australia sought after his services extensively with the latter being the more successful. He debuted with the Redbacks in the 1988/89 season.

Scuderi was a regular face amongst the South Australian first-class team from 1988 until 1999. During that time he played in 2 Prime Minister XI matches and was also selected in the provisional World Cup squad of 20 players in 1992. He signed a 2-year deal in 2000 to play for Lancashire in County cricket. He also joined the Italian national cricket team (he is of Italian heritage) where he became Captain/Coach until 2008 and then Coach until 2016.

Joe now lives in Lancashire in the UK and is a professional cricket coach.

References

External links

Living people
1968 births
Australian cricketers
South Australia cricketers
Lancashire cricketers
Italian cricketers
Australian people of Italian descent
Cricketers from Queensland
Australian cricket coaches
Queensland cricketers
Italian cricket captains